William Allison House is a historic home located at Gregg Township, Centre County, Pennsylvania.  It was built in 1880, and is a three-story, rectangular brick building measuring 42 feet across and 32 feet deep in the Victorian Gothic style architecture.  A two-story frame rear extension was built in 1890.  It features a steep roof and has a variety of gable ends, bargeboards, and windows.

It was added to the National Register of Historic Places in 1977.

References

External links
History - The Lead Horse Bed & Breakfast. Not clear if the B&B is still in operation.

Houses on the National Register of Historic Places in Pennsylvania
Gothic Revival architecture in Pennsylvania
Houses completed in 1880
Houses in Centre County, Pennsylvania
National Register of Historic Places in Centre County, Pennsylvania